Pedro Alexandre dos Santos Barbosa (born 6 August 1970) is a Portuguese retired professional footballer who played as an attacking midfielder.

Best known for his spell at Sporting, he appeared in 367 matches in the Primeira Liga and scored 61 goals, being a player with above-average skills.

Barbosa represented Portugal in one World Cup and one European Championship.

Club career
Born in Gondomar, Porto District, Barbosa unsuccessfully graduated from FC Porto's academy, making his professional debut with lowly S.C. Freamunde in the second division.

He first came to prominence at Vitória de Guimarães, making his Primeira Liga debut at age 21, and joined Sporting CP in 1995–96, remaining at the club for the next ten seasons. Already a veteran, he contributed heavily to the capital team's 2000 and 2002 league titles, appearing in respectively 31 (two goals scored) and 27 games (three).

In his penultimate year, Barbosa netted a career-best nine goals to help Sporting rank in third position. In his last, the 34-year-old played 13 matches as the Lions reached the 2005 UEFA Cup Final played on home soil, scoring all of his two goals against Middlesbrough in the round of 16.

Having played in more than 300 official games for the Lisbon club, Barbosa subsequently became its director of football, leaving the post in early November 2009 after coach Paulo Bento's resignation.

International career
Barbosa won 22 caps for the Portugal national team and scored five goals, over a period of ten years. He represented the nation at UEFA Euro 1996 (playing the last 30 minutes of the 3–0 group stage win against Croatia) and the 2002 FIFA World Cup (no appearances).

|}

Honours

Club
Sporting
Primeira Liga: 1999–2000, 2001–02
Taça de Portugal: 2001–02; runner-up: 1995–96, 1999–2000
Supertaça Cândido de Oliveira: 1995, 2000, 2002
UEFA Cup runner-up: 2004–05

Individual
Primeira Liga Player of the Month: November 2003

References

External links

1970 births
Living people
People from Gondomar, Portugal
Portuguese footballers
Association football midfielders
Primeira Liga players
Liga Portugal 2 players
S.C. Freamunde players
Vitória S.C. players
Sporting CP footballers
Portugal youth international footballers
Portugal under-21 international footballers
Portugal international footballers
UEFA Euro 1996 players
2002 FIFA World Cup players
Sportspeople from Porto District